The filled-in Julia set  of a polynomial  is a Julia set and its interior, non-escaping set

Formal definition

The filled-in Julia set  of a polynomial  is defined as the set of all points  of the dynamical plane that have bounded orbit with respect to 

where:
  is the set of complex numbers

Relation to the Fatou set
The filled-in Julia set is the (absolute) complement of the attractive basin of infinity.

The attractive basin of infinity is one of the components of the Fatou set.

In other words, the filled-in Julia set is the complement of the unbounded Fatou component:

Relation between Julia, filled-in Julia set and attractive basin of infinity

The Julia set is the common boundary of the filled-in Julia set and the attractive basin of infinity

where:  denotes the attractive basin of infinity = exterior of filled-in Julia set = set of escaping points for 

If the filled-in Julia set has no interior then the Julia set coincides with the filled-in Julia set. Such critical points are often called Misiurewicz points.

Spine 

with such properties:
spine lies inside . This makes sense when  is connected and full
 spine is invariant under 180 degree rotation,
 spine is a finite topological tree,
Critical point  always belongs to the spine.
-fixed point is a landing point of external ray of angle zero ,
 is landing point of external ray .

Algorithms for constructing the spine:
detailed version is described by A. Douady
Simplified version of algorithm:
connect  and  within  by an arc,
when  has empty interior then arc is unique,
otherwise take the shortest way that contains .

Curve :

divides dynamical plane into two components.

Images

Names
 airplane
 Douady rabbit
 dragon 
 basilica or San Marco fractal or San Marco dragon
 cauliflower 
 dendrite
 Siegel disc

Notes

References
 Peitgen Heinz-Otto, Richter, P.H. : The beauty of fractals: Images of Complex Dynamical Systems. Springer-Verlag 1986. .
 Bodil Branner : Holomorphic dynamical systems in the complex plane. Department of Mathematics Technical University of Denmark, MAT-Report no. 1996-42.

Fractals
Limit sets
Complex dynamics